Alain Meyer (born 21 November 1949 in Luxembourg City) is a Luxembourgish politician.  He was the President of Luxembourg's Council of State, in which capacity he served from 1 October 2007 till 14 November 2009.

A member of the Luxembourg Socialist Workers' Party since 1981, Meyer was first nominated to the Council of State on 15 November 1991 to replace Georges Thorn.  He was named Vice-President of the Council of State on 18 December 2006, and President on 1 October 2007 to replace Pierre Mores.

Footnotes

Presidents of the Council of State of Luxembourg
Members of the Council of State of Luxembourg
Luxembourg Socialist Workers' Party politicians
1949 births
Living people
People from Luxembourg City
Alumni of the Athénée de Luxembourg